Elkia is an extinct genus of trilobite in the order Asaphida.

References

Asaphida
Articles created by Qbugbot